The Escaped is a 1964 Argentine drama film directed by Enrique Carreras. It won the Silver Condor Award for Best Film and was entered into the 14th Berlin International Film Festival.

Cast
 Juan Carlos Altavista
 Alberto Barcel - Médico
 Guillermo Battaglia
 Tita Merello
 Mario Passano
 Sergio Renán
 Carlos Rivas - Locutor de TV
 Jorge Salcedo
 Walter Vidarte

External links 
 

1964 films
1960s Spanish-language films
Argentine black-and-white films
1964 drama films
Films directed by Enrique Carreras
1960s Argentine films